Old Market or variations with House, Building, or Historic District, may refer to:

in the United States
(by state)
 Old Market (Louisville, Georgia), listed on the NRHP in Georgia
 Old Market House (Galena, Illinois), listed on the NRHP in Illinois
 Old Market (Omaha, Nebraska), listed as Old Market Historic District on the NRHP in Nebraska
 Old Market Building (Georgetown, South Carolina), Georgetown, SC, listed on the NRHP in South Carolina
 Old Market House Museum, Goliad, Texas, listed on the NRHP in Texas

in England
 Old Market, Bristol, a Conservation Area around Old Market Street in Bristol
 The Old Market, Hove, a cultural performance venue
 Old Market, Hereford, a new retail shopping quarter in the city of Hereford, opened Spring 2014